Andreas Roth may refer to:

 Andreas Roth (runner), Norwegian middle-distance runner
 Andreas Roth (painter), German painter
 Andreas Roth (lawyer), German lawyer

See also
 Roth (surname)